Fred's Frozen Foods and Fred's for Starters are frozen food brands that trace their origin to Fred Luker who first started manufacturing frozen meat and vegetable products in Noblesville, Indiana in 1947. As of 2002, both brands are operated by Windsor Quality Food Company, LTD, which is ultimately owned by the Hojel and Meinig families through their holding company HM International based in Tulsa, Oklahoma.

Fred Luker

Fred W. Luker was an entrepreneur and inventor. In 1947, he established Fred's Frozen Foods to provide frozen meat patties and frozen bread vegetables to the wholesale food service industry. Fred's Frozen Foods grew as the food service customers were experience increased growth as consumers began to dine away from home. In the late 1950s, Fred Luker perfected a method of applying a coating of crumbs of breading to a slice of raw meat and subsequently compressing the slice of meat under pressure to embed the crumbs deeply and evenly into the meat. The result was the processed meat patty would be 150% larger. Fred Luker applied for a patent in January 1962.

The Marten Family Purchases Fred's Frozen Foods

In 1960, John S. Marten was managing the Sexton Foods Indianapolis manufacturing plan. At an Indianapolis institutional food service trade show that year, John Marten met Fred Luker. Fred Luker was a 62-year-old frozen food entrepreneur who had developed a small frozen food manufacturing company in Noblesville, Indiana with $500,000 a year in sales. While building his company, Fred developed a process of breading and freezing meat. John S. Marten realized the process could be patented. Fred Luker was looking to retire and sell his business. In early 1961, the Marten Family entered into an agreement to purchase Fred's Frozen Foods from Fred Luker with the stipulation that Fred file a patent (granted in 1965) on his breading process.

In November 1961, John S. Marten and his brother Harry Marten left Sexton Foods. The Marten brothers had advocated an expansion of the Sexton Foods product line to include a frozen food line. However, other family members did not believe that the traditional Sexton customer would be interested in frozen foods since the capital required for restaurants to install freezers and refrigerators was large. In addition, Sexton Foods was reluctant to make the large investment to install freezers in the Sexton warehouses and convert the Sexton delivery fleet to freezer trucks. The value the Marten brothers saw was that a restaurant, hotel, or cafeteria could save on food preparation labor by buying prepared frozen foods that were heat and serve. Frozen foods were priced higher than canned goods and also require the customers have freezer storage. However, the value to the customers was reduced costs in delivering quality finished meals in their restaurants, hotels, cafeterias etc.

As luck would have it, the US government had mandated stricter nutritional standards for school lunches in 1962. This policy shift created a huge demand from the national school lunch program for portion control meat items. In addition, institutional customers were ordering more heat and server frozen food products. To meet the rapid growth, the Martens expanded Fred's Frozen Foods product line to 40 items including breaded frozen vegetables, frozen ethnic entrées, frozen pre-portioned meats and frozen breaded meats. In addition, the Marten added a second manufacturing facility in Carthage, Missouri, increased the distribution network to cover 29 states and increased sales to $6 million in 1970. The Martens sold Fred's Frozen Foods to Central Soya in 1970 for an undisclosed amount.

Central Soya Purchases Fred's Frozen Foods
Central Soya, based in Fort Wayne, Indiana, a leading soybean miller and food processor purchased Fred's Frozen Foods from the Marten Family in August 1970. Central Soya exchanged 150,000 shares of stock  for all Fred's Frozen Foods assets, brands, operating equipment, personnel and $7 million outstanding debt.  The transaction was accounted for as pooling of interest, which valued Fred's Frozen Foods at about $10 million. Central Soya expanded Fred's Frozen Foods product offering to include frozen appetizers and more ethnic entrees. In 1971, Central Soya added a west coast Fred's Frozen Foods distribution warehouse and manufacturing plant in Riverside, California.
In 1982, Fred's Frozen Foods introduced their first mass-produced breaded mozzarella cheese stick for the foodservice industry.

In March, 1985, Shamrock Holdings Inc. of Burbank, California, which was owned by the Roy E. Disney family, acquired the remaining 90% of Central Soya that Shamrock did not already own for approximately $23 per share. Total outstanding shares of Central Soya in 1985 were 13.9 million, which valued the Central Soya at $320 million excluding any outstanding debt. Central Soya revenue for 1985 was $1.73 billion.
 The Shamrock offer was priced at the book value of the Central Soya outstanding stock. In July, 1985 Shamrock announced that it planned to spin off the branded foods which included Fred's Frozen Foods, to concentrate on the Central Soya's agribusiness.

International Multifoods Corporation Purchases Fred's Frozen Foods & Centre Brands

On January 24, 1986, International Multifoods Corporation of Minneapolis, Minnesota announce that it had entered into an agreement to purchase Fred's Frozen Foods and Centre Brands from Central Soya for $73 million. The two newly acquired companies were rolled into International Multifoods Corp's prepared food division.

Doskocil Food Service Company Buys Fred's Frozen Foods & Centre Brands

In March 1994, The Doskocil Company, a maker of pizza toppings and other meat products, agreed to purchase from International Mulifoods Corp the Frozen Specialty Foods Division for $135 million. The brands acquired with the purchase of the division included Fred's Frozen Foods, Rotanelli's, Posada, and Little Juan's. After the acquisition, the new brands were organized as Doskocil Specialty Brands Co. The International Multifoods executive who ran the operation, continued to do so at Doskocil. In the spring of 1995, Doskocil changed its name to Foodbrands America, Inc., to better reflect the company's operations as a broad-based food processor marketing high-profile, branded perishable and frozen foods.

IBP buys Fred’s Frozen Foods
In 1997, Foodbrands America, Inc. was purchased by Iowa Beef Processors IBP for $640 million. In 1999, Foodbrands America, Inc. dba Specialty Brands, LP of Ontario, California registered Fred's for Starters trademark to reflect the new focus of Fred's Frozen Foods to be the leading foodservice provider of prepared appetizers, namely, breaded and battered vegetables, breaded and battered cheese sticks, onion rings, steak nuggets, meat and seafood based prepared appetizers, namely, crab Rangoon, pot stickers and chicken shu mai. Traditionally, Fred's Frozen Foods manufactured unbranded frozen food products for wholesale foodservice distributors. Fred's would package their products to the foodservice distributors specifications. Fred's for Starter brand marked the evolution from contract manufacturer to brand name foodservice provider.

Tyson buys IBP and Spins off Fred’s Frozen Foods (Fred's for Starters)
In September 2001, Tyson purchases IBP for $3 billion and determines that Foodbrands America, Inc's Specialty Brands do not fit the Tyson's corporate strategy.

Windsor Foods Purchases Fred's Frozen Foods (Fred's for Starters)

In April 2002, Tyson announced it had entered into an agreement to sell Foodbrands America, Inc (including Fred's for Starters) to Windsor Quality Food Company, LTD. The brands included in the sale are Butcher Boy (meats), Jose Ole and Posada (Mexican foods), Rotanelli (frozen filled pastas) and Fred's Frozen Foods (frozen meatballs and snacks). Industry estimated that Specialty Brands Inc. was worth $100 million to $200 million. Annual revenues were estimated to be $300 million in 2001. Stephens Inc., a Little Rock, Arkansas investment bank represented Tyson in the sale. Windsor Food  operates Fred's Frozen Foods as Fred's for Starters. Windsor Quality Food Company, LTD is whole owned by the Hojel and Meinig families of Tulsa, Oklahoma through their holding company HM International, LLC.

References

External links
 Windsor Foods Fred's for Starters

Catering and food service companies of the United States
Food and drink companies established in 1947
1947 establishments in Indiana
Private equity portfolio companies